Indiana University may refer to:

Indiana University, a multi-campus public university system in the U.S. state of Indiana, comprising:
Indiana University Bloomington
Indiana University–Purdue University Indianapolis
Indiana University East
Indiana University Fort Wayne 
Indiana University Kokomo
Indiana University Northwest
Indiana University South Bend
Indiana University Southeast
Indiana University–Purdue University Columbus
Indiana University of Pennsylvania
 The Indiana Hoosiers, the athletic program of Indiana University Bloomington

See also
Indiana State University
Indiana University Health
List of colleges and universities in Indiana